Gnanasigamony Devakadasham became the fifth Bishop of Kanyakumari of the Church of South India (CSI) in 2001.

He was elected as Deputy Moderator of CSI Synod on 14 January 2010. Devakadasham was also the Moderator of the CSI Synod from 2010 to 2012.

References

External links
 Anglican Communion website listing

Living people
Senate of Serampore College (University) alumni
Year of birth missing (living people)
Moderators of the Church of South India
Anglican bishops of Kanyakumari